Ponter is a surname. Notable people with the surname include:

 Danielle Ponter (born 2000), Australian rules footballer 
 Daran Ponter (born 1968), New Zealand politician

See also
 Pointer (disambiguation)
 Ponter's Ball Dyke, earthwork in England
 Potter (name)